Mike Faria (born 4 March 1957) is a former speedway rider from the United States.

Speedway career 
Faria is a three times North American champion, winning the AMA National Speedway Championship in 1990, 1991 and 1997.

He rode in the top tier of British Speedway from 1988 until 1996, riding for various clubs.

References 

1957 births
Living people
American speedway riders
Belle Vue Aces riders
Edinburgh Monarchs riders